Patacamaya or Patakamaya (Aymara)  is the fifth municipal section of the Aroma Province in the  La Paz Department, Bolivia. Its seat is Patacamaya.

See also 
 Chullunkhäni
 Ch'alla Jawira
 Inka Pukara
 Jach'a Jawira
 Llallawa
 Misk'i Wat'a
 Sipi Sipi

References 

 Instituto Nacional de Estadística de Bolivia

Municipalities of La Paz Department (Bolivia)